Toimi is an unincorporated community in Lake County, Minnesota, United States. The community is located 31 miles north of the city of Two Harbors at the intersection of Lake County Highway 15 / Forest Highway 11 (co-signed) and County Road 151, Etelainen Road.

Toimi is 29 miles west of Silver Bay, and 27 miles southeast of Hoyt Lakes.  The boundary line between Lake and Saint Louis counties is nearby.

Toimi is within the Superior National Forest, and also located within Lake No. 2 Unorganized Territory of Lake County.

Store Creek flows through the community.  Lake County Highway 2 and Sullivan Lake Campground are both nearby.

The unincorporated communities of Fairbanks and Brimson are also nearby.

References

Unincorporated communities in Minnesota
Unincorporated communities in Lake County, Minnesota